West Suffolk District is a local government district in Suffolk, England, which was established on 1 April 2019, following the merger of the existing Forest Heath district with the borough of St Edmundsbury. The two councils had already had a joint Chief Executive since 2011. At the 2011 census, the two districts had a combined population of 170,756. It is currently controlled by the Conservative Party.

The main towns in the new district are Bury St Edmunds, Newmarket, Brandon, Haverhill and Mildenhall.

The district covers a smaller area compared to the former administrative county of West Suffolk, which was abolished by the Local Government Act 1972.

Communities
The district council area is made up of 5 towns and 97 civil parishes, with the whole area being parished.

Towns
Brandon
Bury St Edmunds
Clare
Haverhill
Mildenhall
Newmarket

Civil parishes

Governance 

As of 2021, the Conservative Party control West Suffolk Council. As of May 2021 the council consists of the following Parties:

The Conservatives won 43 of the 64 seats in the first election held on 2 May 2019. It was held concurrently with other local elections across the United Kingdom.

Responsibilities
Since 1 April 2019 West Suffolk Council has been responsible for:
 culture and community development
 economic development
 housing
 licensing and environmental health
 planning and building control
 running elections
 waste and recycling

Councillors

As of March 2022 the council consists of the following Parties. The West Suffolk Independents and Green Party are part of the Independents Group 12 Councillors are also amongst the 14 Suffolk County Councillors elected from West Suffolk District. They marked with an * on the chart below.

The council area is divided up into 43 wards and represented by 64 councillors.

See also
2019 structural changes to local government in England
East Suffolk, another district that was created in Suffolk on 1 April 2019.

References

External links

 
Non-metropolitan districts of Suffolk